The Pinnacle Bank Championship is a golf tournament on the Korn Ferry Tour. It was first played in July 2017 at The Club at Indian Creek in Omaha, Nebraska.

Winners

Bolded golfers graduated to the PGA Tour via the Korn Ferry Tour regular-season money list.

See also
Cox Classic, a previous Korn Ferry Tour event in Omaha, played from 1996 to 2013

References

External links

Coverage on the Korn Ferry Tour's official site

Korn Ferry Tour events
Golf in Nebraska
Sports competitions in Omaha, Nebraska